Schizochlamys is a genus of green algae in the family Schizochlamydaceae.

References

External links

Sphaeropleales genera
Sphaeropleales